Route 72, also known as Port de Grave Road, is a short  east-west highway on the Port de Grave Peninsula of Newfoundland. It is the primary road access on-and-off the peninsula, with the only other road being Otterbury Road.

Route description

Route 72 begins in Bay Roberts at an intersection with Route 70 (Conception Bay Highway). It heads east to pass through Coley's Point and Black Duck Pond to enter Bareneed, where it has an intersection with Otterbury Road. Google Maps and Google Earth erroneously label this portion as Bareneed Road, even though this is not the case. The highway now passes through downtown Hussey's Cove and Ship Cove before winding its way through hilly terrain as it bypasses Blow Me Down to the north. Route 72 now passes through Hibb's Cove and curves to the south to enter Pick Eyes, where it comes to a dead end in a neighbourhood along the coast.

Major intersections

References

072